The British International School of Zagreb (BISZ) is a British international school in Zagreb, Croatia. It is a sister institution of the Kreativan razvoj Primary School. First opening on 2 September 2013, the school is scheduled to include years 1–13.

References

External links

 

International schools in Croatia
Schools in Zagreb
Zagreb
Educational institutions established in 2013
2013 establishments in Croatia